The name Bavi has been used to name four tropical cyclones in the Western Pacific Ocean. The name was contributed by Vietnam and refers to a mountain chain in northern Vietnam.

 Tropical Storm Bavi (2002) (T0222, 26W)
 Tropical Storm Bavi (2008) (T0818, 23W)
 Tropical Storm Bavi (2015) (T1503, 03W, Betty)
 Typhoon Bavi (2020) (T2008, 09W, Igme) – Category 3 typhoon that made landfall in North Korea.

Pacific typhoon set index articles